Biotin hydrazide is a biotinyl derivative that can be used as a probe for the determination of protein carbonylation. It readily forms Schiff bases with carbonyl groups.

References

Reagents for biochemistry
Hydrazides